The Child in Time is a British television film directed by Julian Farino, adaptation of the 1987 novel of the same name by Ian McEwan. The film premiered on BBC One on Sunday 24 September 2017 and stars Benedict Cumberbatch.

Cast and characters
Benedict Cumberbatch as Stephen Lewis, a successful children's book author whose daughter goes missing.
Kelly Macdonald as Julie, Lewis' estranged wife
Stephen Campbell Moore as Charles, Lewis' best friend
Saskia Reeves as Thelma, Charles's wife
John Hopkins as Home Secretary
Beatrice White as Kate Lewis

Production
The film was announced on 15 February 2017, as the first commission for Pinewood Television and SunnyMarch TV for BBC One, with Benedict Cumberbatch cast as Stephen Lewis. Kelly Macdonald, Stephen Campbell Moore and Saskia Reeves joined the cast in April 2017. Filming started in April 2017 in London.

Locations
Film locations in London included a Co-op supermarket in Crouch End, Hornsey Town Hall and the National Theatre in Lambeth. Other locations include Shingle Street, a hamlet on the Suffolk coast. The family was depicted as living in Maida Vale and several exterior scenes were filmed around Elgin Avenue.

Reception

Critical response
On review aggregator Rotten Tomatoes, the film holds an approval rating of 81% based on 21 reviews, and an average rating of 7.2/10. The website's critical consensus reads, "The Child in Time skillfully resists melodrama, trusting the finer details of its story -- and the actors bringing them to life -- to land with a slow-building, devastating impact." On Metacritic, the film has a weighted average score of 83 out of 100, based on 5 critics, indicating "universal acclaim".

References

External links
 
 

2017 television films
2017 films
BBC television dramas
British television films
English-language television shows
Films based on British novels
Films set in London
Films directed by Julian Farino